The 2006–07 Davidson Wildcats men's basketball team represented Davidson College in NCAA men's Division I competition during the 2006–07 NCAA Division I men's basketball season. Coached by Bob McKillop and led by freshman guard Stephen Curry, the Wildcats won the Southern Conference regular season and tournament titles, and reached the 2007 NCAA Division I men's basketball tournament. The team finished with an overall record of 29–5 (17–1 SoCon).

Roster

Schedule and results

|-
!colspan=9 style=| Regular season
|-

|-
!colspan=9 style=| SoCon Tournament
|-

|-
!colspan=9 style=| NCAA Tournament
|-

Awards and honors
Stephen Curry – SoCon Freshman of the Year
Bob McKillop – SoCon Coach of the Year

References

Davidson Wildcats men's basketball seasons
Davidson
Southern Conference men's basketball champion seasons
Davidson Wildcats men's b
Davidson Wildcats men's b
Davidson